The Canadian Surface Combatant, formerly the Single Class Surface Combatant Project is the name given to the procurement project that will replace the  and  warships with up to 15 new ships beginning in the mid to late 2020s as part of the National Shipbuilding Procurement Strategy.

The replacement vessels will be somewhat larger than the existing Halifax class, and presumably provide a wide-area air defence capability, anti-submarine as well as anti-ship warfare capability. The design of these ships is currently underway and both the total number of ships and their capability will be dependent on the budget that is allocated to the project. In 2017, a new defence policy framework, entitled Strong, Secure and Engaged, was unveiled which promised significantly greater resources for the Surface Combatant Project - i.e. in the range of $60 billion. By 2021, the Parliamentary Budget Officer estimated the cost for the program of 15 Type 26 ships as $77.3 billion, "rising to $79.7 billion if there is a one-year delay in the start of construction and $82.1 billion if there is a two-year delay".

By December 2017, the three submitted proposals were:
 British Type 26 frigate design proposed by Lockheed Martin Canada and BAE Systems
 Dutch -based design proposed by Alion Canada and Damen Group
 Spanish F-105 frigate design offered by Navantia

On 19 October 2018, it was announced that the Type 26 was the "preferred design" and the government "will now enter into negotiations with the winning bidder to confirm it can deliver everything promised in the complex proposal." However, after litigation by one of the failed bids, Alion Canada, was announced in November 2018, the government was ordered to postpone any discussion of contracts until the investigation by the Canadian International Trade Tribunal was complete. The Trade Tribunal dismissed the complaint for lack of standing on 31 January 2019, and the Canadian government announced they had signed the $60 billion contract with the winning bidders on 8 February 2019. Alion appealed the decision to Federal Court, but discontinued its challenge in November 2019.

History
The Single Class Surface Combatant Project is a naval procurement program for the Royal Canadian Navy created to replace the aging Iroquois-class anti-air warfare destroyers and Halifax-class multi-role frigates. The Iroquois and Halifax ships have come to the end or are nearing the end of their service lives and require replacement. The Iroquois class was originally scheduled for retirement around 2010 after 40 years in service; the ships were then expected to have their service lives extended until replacements were commissioned. However, all four have been decommissioned, the last being  in March 2017.  The Halifax class is projected to end their service lives in the 2020s.

The navy had investigated adopting the active phased array radar (APAR), leading observers to suggest that APAR and the associated SMART-L would equip the Single-Class Surface Combatant or upgraded Halifax-class ships during the Frigate Equipment Life Extension (FELEX) project. Upgrades to the existing Halifax class with such a system would likely be difficult since the APAR requires its own mast and might make the Halifax-class design top-heavy.

In the 2008 Canadian National Shipbuilding Procurement Strategy, $26 billion was planned for the construction of the 15 vessels of the Single Class Surface Combatant Project. The first ships were slated to become available in 2026. The initial plan called for separate bids for design and integration of systems aboard the vessels. The government later investigated merging those bids.

On 26 October 2012 a letter of interest was published by Public Works and Government Services Canada to announce a session in which interested firms could find out the needs of DND for the new class and the project in general. The closing date was 5 November 2012. On 20 January 2015, Irving Shipbuilding was named the prime contractor for the program. The role of the lead contractor gave Irving Shipbuilding overall control of the project, and the company had already won the right to build the vessels at its yard in Halifax, Nova Scotia. This led to questions concerning the bidding process and the awarding of the contracts. In fall 2015, high increases in costs were reported, more than doubling to $30 billion from $14 billion for the new warships. The total cost of the naval ship building program rose from $26.2 billion to $42 billion in a study. This put in jeopardy the number of ships that could be produced and raised the prospect of ships with reduced capabilities.

In November 2015, seven companies were pre-qualified for the combat systems integrator role. Atlas Elektronik, DCNS, Lockheed Martin Canada, Saab Australia, Selex ES, Thales Nederland and ThyssenKrupp Marine Systems Canada all made the shortlist. For the warship designer role, the following companies were pre-qualified: Alion-JJMA, BAE Systems, DCNS, Fincantieri, Navantia, Odense Maritime Technology and ThyssenKrupp Marine Systems Canada.

On 13 June 2016, Minister of Public Services and Procurement Judy Foote announced that the government would buy and modify an off-the-shelf design for the new warships, instead of designing them from scratch. The minister said a competitive bid for an existing design would knock about two years off the process and save money. The nearly $2 billion saving in research and development costs would allow for more ships to be built and the integration of more advanced technology with increased capability, over the long term.

It was originally anticipated that two CSC ship variants would have been acquired to replace the specific capabilities of the Iroquois-class destroyers and Halifax-class frigates. As originally intended, both variants would have the necessary combat capabilities to operate in air, surface and subsurface threat environments. A small number of ships (up to five) would have additionally incorporated the sensors, guided weapons and command and fire control facilities necessary to perform large-area air defence, along with having the facilities to be task force flagships. The remaining ships would have replaced the capabilities provided by the current fleet of Halifax-class frigates as a more general purpose/antisubmarine warfare variant. However, only one variant will be acquired due to cost effectiveness, crew training efficiencies, and being better suited to the navy's operational needs.

On 20 October 2020, Alan Williams (former Assistant Deputy Minister, Supply Operations Service in Public Works and Government Services Canada, and former Assistant Deputy Minister of Materiel at the Department of National Defence) released a paper examining the estimated life-cycle costs of Canada's Canadian Surface Combatants. Williams estimated that acquisition, operating and supporting the Canadian Surface Combatants throughout their life-cycle of approximately 30 years will cost between $213.5 and $219.6 billion. Approximately two-thirds of these costs are attributable to the long-term operations and support (O&S) costs of the CSC.

This report caught the attention of the House of Commons Standing Committee on Government Operations and Estimates. Additionally, the National Shipbuilding Strategy was set to have a planned Auditor General review in early 2021. This level of watchdog review and spiralling cost estimates drew parallels to Canada's cancelled acquisition of F-35 Lightning II fighter jets.

Bids
In October 2016 it was reported that twelve bidders had been asked to submit their designs by 27 April 2017. Foote announced that only designs from ships already in service or mature existing designs would be part of the process. However, concerns were raised when it was revealed that BAE Systems would be expected to submit their Type 26 frigate for consideration even though it had not yet been built. Delays in the bidding process were announced by the government in February 2017 after a third of the entrants requested more time to compile a bid. Bids were to be submitted by 22 June with a winner expected to be declared in Fall 2017. Further delay in the bidding process arose due to the Government of Canada's demand that any intellectual property associated with the vessel be transferred upon purchase. This led to a diplomatic exchange and one of the bidders' nations to demand direct negotiations between governments. The selection of the design was pushed to Spring 2018. The deadline for bids was first extended to 17 November, then again to 30 November 2017.

On 28 November 2017, BAE Systems along with its partners Lockheed Martin Canada; CAE Inc.; L3 Technologies; MacDonald, Dettwiler and Associates; and Ultra Electronics, officially pitched their Type 26 warship design for the Canadian Surface Combatant project. Another front-runner, a joint bid by Fincantieri and Naval Group (formerly DCNS) for their FREMM multipurpose frigate was offered informally on 6 November, directly to the National Defence Minister, Harjit Sajjan, which he did not accept. Fincantieri and Naval Group de facto withdrew from the process by not making a formal bid by 30 November 2017 deadline. The company's fixed price offer of $20.9 billion was lower than the other bids. However, unlike the other bids, this price excluded the cost of design, infrastructure, spare parts, training, ammunition, contingencies and project management. (Typically, the acquisition of the ships themselves only represents about 50-60% of the project's overall budget). The unsolicited bid was rejected because it came outside of the official bidding process. However, on 8 December 2017, Naval Group/Fincantieri announced they would continue to submit and support their unsolicited bid, with letters of project endorsement and promised long-term support from French Defence Minister Florence Parly and Italian Defence Minister Roberta Pinotti. Naval Group and Fincantieri said they could provide the vessels to the Canadian government for $20.9 billion and begin construction at Irving as early as 2019.

It was also believed that due to concerns over the fairness of the bidding process, two European shipbuilders, possibly Germany's ThyssenKrupp Marine Systems and Denmark's Odense Maritime Technology, declined to submit bids.

Confirmed contenders
 Alion-JJMA – De Zeven Provinciën-class frigate
 BAE Systems – Type 26 frigate
 Navantia – F-105 frigate

Rejected bids
 Naval Group/Fincantieri – FREMM-ER multipurpose frigate (rejected)

In October 2018, the group led by BAE Systems and Lockheed Martin Canada and offering the Type 26, were selected as the preferred design.

In February 2019, the design and design team for Canada's future surface combatant had determined and the corresponding contracts were awarded.

Construction
Given the need to fully develop the Canadian design, tool up the shipyard and first complete the preceding eight-vessel Arctic Offshore Patrol Ship project, the currently envisaged start date for construction is in 2024 with the first vessel probably not entering service until the early 2030s.

The last ship is expected to have been delivered, commissioned and upgraded to have complete operational capability by the late 2040s.

List of ships

References

External links
Canadian Surface Combatant
Single-Class Surface Combatant (SCSC)
Single-Class Surface Combatant (SCSC) project
Canadian Surface Combatant Fact Sheet
Ship Building Project

Proposed ships of the Royal Canadian Navy
Canadian defence procurement